The 2006–07 Northern Counties East Football League season was the 25th in the history of Northern Counties East Football League, a football competition in England.

Premier Division

The Premier Division featured 18 clubs which competed in the previous season, along with two new clubs, promoted from Division One:
Carlton Town
Retford United

Also, Brodsworth Miners Welfare changed name to Brodsworth Welfare.

League table

Division One

Division One featured 14 clubs which competed in the previous season, along with three clubs.
Clubs joined from the West Yorkshire League:
AFC Emley
Nostell Miners Welfare

Plus:
Dinnington Town, joined from the Central Midlands League

Also, Worsbrough Bridge Miners Welfare changed name to Worsbrough Bridge Athletic.

League table

References

External links
 Northern Counties East Football League

2006-07
9